Phil Carmen (born Herbert Hofmann, February 14, 1953 in Lucerne, Switzerland) is a Swiss musician and producer of Canadian heritage.

Early career
Carmen grew up in Frankfurt am Main, Germany and in Lucerne, Switzerland. In Lucerne, he went to the Conservatory, but later studied bookkeeping. In 1975, he decided to turn to music. With bassist Mike Thompson (born Marcel Caluzzi), he founded the duo Carmen & Thompson, playing especially country music. The single "Time Moves On" reached #31 on the Italian charts in 1980, and in 1981 they appeared at the San-Remo-Festival performing the song "Follow Me".

Solo career 
After seven years of stage experience Phil Carmen founded the Picar Studios in Stein am Rhein, Switzerland in 1982 and recorded two solo albums which attracted little attention until 1985, when he had a hit with the LP Walkin' the Dog, which reached #3 in the Swiss charts. The single "On My Way In LA" was his greatest success and climbed in the summer of 1985 to #18 in Germany and #9 in Switzerland. "On My Way In LA" was also used in the television series Wild West in 1988. 
His 1986 album Wise Monkeys hit #1 on the Swiss charts, while the single "Moonshine Still" reached #10. His last successful album as a solo artist was City Walls (1987), which went to #10 in Switzerland. The corresponding promotional tour led to the Live in Montreux album with the same band line up of Brian Auger on organ, Pick Withers and Larry E. Van on drums, Dick Morrissey on sax, Steve Dawson on trumpet, Steve Evens on bass, Alexander Leon on bassoon and Sabine van Baaren, backing vocals.

In 1986 he founded the country band Clover Leaf. His 1993 album Skyline again featured Dick Morrissey and also Richard Tee. In 1996 he released an album of Bob Dylan covers, Bob Dylan's Dream, as well as the album Drive and a greatest hits compilation, Cool & Collected: Best of Phil Carmen and Mike Thompson. His subsequent releases include On My Way to L.A. (1999), Back from L.A. Live (1999), No Sweat (2007), and two greatest hits collections, Millennium Collection (2002) and My Way: Hits & Rarities (2007).

Discography

Carmen & Thompson

1979 "Time moves on" (album)
1981 "No chance romance" (Album)
1994 "Greatest Hits"

1980 "Time Moves On" (Single)
1980 "Indian Queens" (Single)
1981 "Follow Me" (Single)
1987 "The Sun Goes Down" (Single)

Phil Carmen (solo)

Albums
1982 Phrases, Patterns an' Shades
1982 Backfire
1985 Walkin' the Dog
1986 Wise Monkeys
1987 City Walls
1987 Live in Montreux
1988 Changes
1991 Drive
1992 The Best of 10 Years 1982-1992, Cool & Collected
1993 No Strings Attached
1993 Skyline
1993 Great Hits (Live)
1994 Back From L.A. Live
1995 No sweat
1996 Bob Dylan's Dream
1999 Back from L.A. Live

Singles
1985 On My Way in LA (Germany #18, Austria #23, Switzerland #9)
1986 Moonshine Still (Germany #33, Switzerland #10)
1987 Workaholic Slave (Maxi Single)
1988 God's Creation
1991 Borderline Down (Germany #52)
1993 One Foot in Heaven
1995 No Sweat

Clover Leaf
1986 Clover Elixier (Album)
1992 Born a Rider (Album)

Notes

External links 
 
Picture of the musicians (approx. 1978), left Phil Carmen (Herbert Hofmann), right Mike Thompson (Marcel Galuzzi)

1953 births
Living people
20th-century Swiss musicians